Andrzej Woźniak  (born 23 October 1965, in Konin) is a  Polish goalkeeping coach and retired  professional football goalkeeper that played most often for ŁKS Łódź and Widzew Łódź, and also had a short spell in the Portuguese top flight. Known as one of the best goalkeepers in his country he made 20 appearances for the Poland national football team.

Club career
Starting at his hometown team of Górnik Konin, Woźniak spent much of his playing career in Łódź; first at ŁKS and then at Widzew, enjoying three separate spells at the club. It was with Widzew that Woźniak enjoyed his greatest success by winning the Polish Championship. Not only did he have the joint best record in terms of goals conceded, the team remained undefeated throughout the successful campaign. It was an incredible achievement and it was not long before some of the bigger teams around Europe came knocking at the door.

In 1996 Woźniak moved to Portuguese giants FC Porto but appearances were limited at the club. He had a loan spell at SC Braga but soon returned to Poland, first with Lech Poznań and then with Widzew Łódź once more.

National Team
Woźniak represented Poland 20 times at the international level. His moment of glory in a Poland shirt came in the 1996 European Championship qualifying match in Paris against France. With the score at 1-1, France won a penalty but Woźniak was equal to the task, saving from Bixente Lizarazu and keeping out the rebound from Vincent Guerin.

International

Coaching career
Woźniak between 2018 and 2020 was employed by the Polish national team as a goalkeeping coach. Prior to this appointment he worked in the same role for several Polish clubs with Widzew Łódź, Korona Kielce, Pogoń Szczecin, Lech Poznań, Dolcan Ząbki and Lechia Gdańsk among them. Woźniak also worked as an assistant manager at some of the teams highlighted above including Widzew, Korona and Pogoń before choosing to focus more on goalkeeping coaching. In February 2021 he was appointed goalkeeper coach at Widzew once more.

References

External links
 

1965 births
Living people
Polish footballers
Poland international footballers
Widzew Łódź players
ŁKS Łódź players
Lech Poznań players
FC Porto players
S.C. Braga players
Pogoń Szczecin managers
Expatriate footballers in Portugal
People from Konin
Sportspeople from Greater Poland Voivodeship
Association football goalkeepers
Polish football managers
Polish expatriate sportspeople in Portugal